The national parliaments of the European Union are those legislatures responsible for each member state of the European Union (EU). They have a certain degree of institutionalised influence which was expanded under the Treaty of Lisbon to include greater ability to scrutinise proposed European Union law.

Relations

Originally, national members of Parliament (MPs) were appointed to the European Parliament (EP) as Member of the European Parliament (MEPs). In 1979 the first direct elections were held, however national MPs still tended to contest these leading to them holding a "dual mandate". As the work load of an MEP increased, the number of MEPs who were also national MPs decreased and since 2009 it has been banned in all member states.

In 1989 MPs from national parliaments and the European Parliament established the Conference of European Community Affairs Committees (COSAC) to maintain contact between national parliaments and the MEPs. COSAC continues to meet every six months and has now gained the right to submit contributions and examine proposals on EU law relating to Justice and Home Affairs. Aside from COSAC, relations between the EP and national parliaments are dealt with by the Conference of Presidents. The EP seeks to keep national parliament's fully informed of the EPs activities and some EP committees regularly invites national MPs to discuss proposals.

However COSAC itself has little institutional structure and is largely leaderless meaning it is difficult for it to exercise its powers. Any concerted response tends to be spontaneous and self organised.

Role and powers

Because the Maastricht Treaty of 1993 expanded the EU's competencies into areas of justice and home affairs, the treaty outlined the importance of exchanges between the European parliament and its national counterparts in a declaration attached to the treaty. This declaration asked national governments to ensure proposals for EU law were passed on to national parliaments with sufficient time for them to be scrutinised by MP and that contacts between these MPs and MEPs, began with COSAC, be stepped up.

This was strengthened under the Treaty of Amsterdam in a protocol stating all European Commission consultation documents be promptly forwarded to national parliaments. They then have a six-week period to discuss legislative proposals, starting from the publication of the proposal to it appearing on the agenda of the Council of the European Union.

The Treaty of Lisbon, in force from 1 December 2009, expanded the role of national parliaments. It sets out a right to information (TEU Article 12, TFEU Articles 70 and 352 and Protocol 1), monitoring of subsidiarity – see below – (TFEU Article 69), scrutinising policy in freedom, justice and security with the ability for a national parliament to veto a proposal (TEFU Articles 81, 85 and 88), taking part in treaty amendment (TEU Article 48) (including blocking a change of voting system to ordinary legislative procedure under the passerelle clause), being involved with enlargement and generally being involved in dialogue with EU institutions (TEU Article 12).

Their power to enforce the principle of subsidiarity is of particular note. The principle is that, unless EU institutions have exclusive power, action will only be taken at a European level if it were to be more effective than acting at a national level. If a national parliament believes this principle has been broken, then this triggers a two-stage procedure: if one-third of national parliaments agree that a proposal breaks the principle, then the commission has to withdraw, amend or maintain it. If the commission maintains its proposal and a majority of parliaments continue to object, then the commission will have to explain its reasons. However it may still continue, as this power does not challenge the legislative role of the Council and European Parliament. The first time the objections-threshold of 1/3 was reached was in 2012 with the Monti II Regulation.

Prior to the Lisbon Treaty's enforcement, COSAC ran tests on the subsidiarity system to test and improve their response time to a question subsidiarity. Tests ended once Lisbon came into force and national parliament's responses to EU legislative proposals have become minimal. Although COSAC is primarily technical, it has been started to become more political especially since the Lisbon Treaty. They have begun to discuss more general political events and foreign policy issues. It is debated whether, in the limited time COSAC meetings have, it should be discussing subjects where it has such limited influence.

Defence policy
As the Western European Union (WEU) was integrated into the European Union's Common Security and Defence Policy, the European Parliament took on a greater role. However, the Assembly of the Western European Union was retained to hold members to account for military missions. With the European Parliament not see as sufficient to take over this role, there was some desire to see the WEU's Assembly retained, rather than abolished as the European Parliament wished. However, with the closure of the WEU (and its assembly) in 2010, there were proposals to ensure that EU cooperation between national parliaments took over its role informally through regular meetings of defence-interested national MPs. The Lisbon Treaty calls for COSAC to establish a body to scrutinise European foreign and defence policy; however no agreement has been reached.

Differences

There are a number of differences between the national parliaments of member states, owing to the various historical development of each country. 15 states have unicameral parliaments, with the remainders choosing bicameral systems.

Unicameral or lower houses are always directly elected, whereas an upper house may be directly elected (e.g. the Senate of Poland); or indirectly elected, for example, by regional legislatures (e.g. the Federal Council of Austria); or non-elected, but representing certain interest groups (e.g. the National Council of Slovenia).

Furthermore, most states are Parliamentary democracies, hence the executive is drawn from the Parliament. However, in some cases a more presidential system is followed and hence there are separate elections for the head of government and the Parliament, leading to greater discontinuity, yet more independence, between the two branches of government. However, only Cyprus follows a fully presidential system, with France following a semi-presidential system.

List

See also
 European Parliament
 Member of the European Parliament
 List of legislatures by country

Notes

References

External links
 COSAC official website

European Parliament
Politics of the European Union